Jonathan Kendrick Lewis (October 29, 1983 – September 26, 2012), also credited as Johnny K. Lewis, was an American film and television actor. He played Kip "Half-Sack" Epps in the first two seasons of the FX series Sons of Anarchy, and other television roles such as Gilby in The Sausage Factory (2001–2002), Pearce Chase in Quintuplets (2004–2005), and Dennis "Chili" Childress in The O.C. (2005–2006). He also appeared in supporting roles in the films Underclassman (2005), Aliens vs. Predator: Requiem (2007), Felon (2008), and The Runaways (2010).

In 2012, he killed his landlady along with a cat before falling off the roof of the house they lived in.

Early life
Lewis grew up in the Los Angeles neighborhoods of North Hollywood and Sherman Oaks.  He was the middle child of Michael and Divona Lewis.  His parents were practicing Scientologists and Johnny was himself a Scientologist for most of his life.  After finishing school, he left home at the age of 18 to pursue an acting career.

Career
Lewis began making television appearances while in his late teens, with guest starring roles in  Boston Public (2000), The Guardian (2001), and American Dreams (2002), among others. His debut feature film performance premiered in 2004, in New Line Cinema's Raise Your Voice, and he followed that up with Miramax Films' Underclassman in 2005. He co-starred as Pearce Chase, one of five siblings on the Fox series Quintuplets, and appeared in the movie Raise Your Voice (2004) alongside Hilary Duff. He guest starred in four episodes of the Nickelodeon television series Drake & Josh as Scottie, one of Drake's bandmates, and from 2005 to 2006, he played Dennis "Chili" Childress on The O.C. Lewis also had a guest spot in the third episode of Smallville season 5.

He also starred in the film Magic Valley (2011), which premiered at the Tribeca Film Festival. Lewis was well known for his role as prospect biker Kip "Half-Sack" Epps in the first two seasons of the FX series Sons of Anarchy.

Personal life
Lewis dated American singer Katy Perry from 2005 to 2006. In mid-2009, Lewis learned he and his then-girlfriend, actress Diane Gaeta, were expecting a baby. The couple had split up by April 6, 2010, when the couple's daughter, Culla May, was born, but briefly attempted sharing a residence. Lewis eventually moved out, after which the couple engaged in a "long and painful" custody battle that Lewis ultimately lost.

Religion
Lewis was raised in a "Jewish-oriented household",  though his family also practiced Scientology; his parents attained the highest available level within Scientology, called "Operating Thetan", or OT VIII. He starred in Scientology training films, and was a sponsor of the Scientology drug rehabilitation group Narconon. Lewis left the Church of Scientology in his early 20s.

Legal troubles
Lewis was arrested three times between 2011 and 2012. In January 2012, he struck two men in the head with a bottle while engaged in a fight. He pleaded no contest to charges of assault with a deadly weapon in the case. The second arrest came about six weeks after the first, with Lewis accused of attempting to break into a woman's home. He pleaded no contest in that case as well. Considering the cases, a probation official expressed that he was "very concerned for the well-being of not only the community but that of the defendant", that Lewis suffered from mental health issues as well as chemical dependency, and that Lewis would "continue to be a threat to any community he may reside in".  Lewis was released from a Los Angeles County, California, jail on September 21, 2012, five days before his death.

Psychiatric diagnosis
On October 30, 2011, Lewis suffered head injuries from a high-speed motorcycle accident. Though an MRI was recommended, and Lewis' father scheduled  MRI tests twice, Lewis refused to take them. Lewis's father also states that he "pursued and encouraged psychiatric treatment for his son. It was Johnny who refused to comply." He started manifesting bizarre and illogical behavior from that point on and concurrent to his ensuing legal troubles.

Bill Jensen reported in Los Angeles magazine that Lewis and his attorneys pushed for rehab for marijuana addiction. When Lewis rejected this, they pursued rehab for alcoholism, to avoid trial.

In early August 2012, Lewis was well enough to be granted provisional out-patient status. He made a deal with the District Attorney of the San Fernando Court - his freedom for "time served". Lewis was assured that he would likely just spend a couple more days in jail, no more. The couple of days turned into nearly two more months, during which he suffered a severe downturn in health and spirits. He was released from jail September 21, 2012.

Death
On September 26, 2012, Lewis and his 81-year-old landlady, Catherine Davis were found dead at Davis' home. Davis was known in Hollywood for operating the Writers' Villa, a bed-and-breakfast for up-and-coming performers, directors and writers, in her home. Lewis, who had previously lived there in 2009, had recently moved back in. Police were called by neighbors after Lewis violently attacked two people at the property next door and Davis was heard screaming. Officers from the Los Angeles Police Department (LAPD) found Lewis' body on the home's driveway. Davis was found dead inside the house with severe head injuries; her pet cat was also found dead in a bathroom.

Neighbors reported that Lewis had jumped over a fence to the next-door property, assaulted a house painter and the homeowner (to whom Lewis had earlier introduced himself as "John, your new neighbor"), and then jumped back over the fence onto Davis' property. According to the LAPD, Lewis then either fell or jumped from the roof, garage, or patio of Davis' house. His death was investigated as a homicide, and it was later determined that he had killed Davis by manual strangulation and blunt force trauma to her head.

An autopsy report released on November 29, 2012, stated that Lewis did not have any drugs or alcohol in his system when he died. He had a history of drug abuse, leading to speculation by his attorney that the actor may have suffered a drug-induced psychosis when he allegedly killed his landlady. Toxicology reports came back negative for alcohol, cocaine, marijuana, psychedelic drugs, or anti-psychotic medication. The autopsy indicated he had suffered partial strangulation and had fingernail marks on his neck when he died. There was no indication that Lewis had been pushed or that he jumped from the roof in an act of suicide. His death was ruled accidental.

Lewis' family has spoken out about his history of untreated head trauma, leading some to speculate that he developed a psychological disorder, which led to his sudden spurts of violence.

Filmography

Film

Television

References

External links
 
 

1983 births
2012 deaths
21st-century American male actors
Accidental deaths from falls
Accidental deaths in California
American male child actors
American male film actors
American male television actors
American murderers
American former Scientologists
American people convicted of assault
Jewish American male actors
Male actors from Los Angeles